Carl Hubert Maria Freiherr von Wendt (born 21 January 1832; died 11 December 1903) was a German landowner and Center Party politician.

Biography

Carl Hubert Maria Freiherr von Wendt attended the Knight Academy in Bedburg. He later studied law in Bonn and Berlin. In 1853, he became a member of the Corps Borussia Bonn. Then, he became government trainee in Münster and government assessor in Arnsberg. He later dedicated himself to managing family property, including the Gevelinghausen Castle.

Family

Carl Hubert Maria Freiherr von Wendt came from the aristocratic Wendt family (from the Papenhausen lineage), and was the son of Franz Freiherr von Wendt (1800-1870) and his first wife Ida Bernhardine Countess von Plettenberg (1806-1834), from the Lenhausen family.

References

External links
Carl Hubert von Wendt in the database of members of the Reichstag

1832 births
1903 deaths
German landowners